GERA Europe is the European wing of the Global Entertainment Retail Association. It is a Brussels-based umbrella group for trade associations representing entertainment retailers and distributors across Europe. It has active members in six European countries.

History
GERA Europe, the Global Entertainment Retail Association-Europe is the trade association of entertainment retailers in Europe. It was set up in August 2000 as the European arm of the Global Entertainment Retail Alliance, an international grouping of retailers.

Activities
Much of GERA Europe's work consists of monitoring EU developments and keeping member associations informed on upcoming legislation which may affect them. The organisation also collates and distributes information on entertainment industry. On occasion, GERA Europe will make representations to lawmakers.

Member organisations
The following are member organisations of GERA Europe:
Austrian Entertainment Retailers Association - Austria
Belgian Entertainment Retailers Association|BERA - Belgian Entertainment Retailers Association - Belgium
Syndicat des Détaillants Spécialisés du Disque|SDSD - Syndicat des Détaillants Spécialisés du Disque - France
Gesamtverband Deutscher Musikfachgeschäfte|GDM - Gesamtverband Deutscher Musikfachgeschäfte - Germany
HAMM - Handelsverband Musik und Medien - Germany
NVGD - Nederlandse Vereniging van Grammofoonplaten Detailhandelaren - Netherlands
ERA - Entertainment Retailers Association - United Kingdom

GERA Europe is supported by a secretariat based in Brussels.

References

External links
Official GERA Europe website

Pan-European trade and professional organizations
Entertainment organizations